Units pel Bàsquet Gandia, also known as Hispagan UPB Gandia by sponsorship reasons, is a Spanish basketball club based in Gandia, Valencian Community that currently plays in LEB Plata, the third tier of Spanish basketball.

History
UPB Gandia was founded in 2013 with the aim to replace Gandia BA, that was dissolved in 2013 and achieved to play in LEB Oro during three seasons until its resign.

After three seasons in Liga EBA, the club achieves the promotion to LEB Plata in the 2015–16 season after winning the play-off stage played in Gandia.

Sponsorship naming

Hispagan UPB Gandia 2014–present

Season by season

References

External links

Basketball teams in the Valencian Community
Basketball teams established in 2013
2013 establishments in the Valencian Community
Liga EBA teams
Former LEB Plata teams
Gandia